Stenolophini is a tribe of ground beetles in the family Carabidae. There are more than 30 genera and 690 described species in Stenolophini.

Genera
These 35 genera belong to the tribe Stenolophini:

 Acupalpus Latreille, 1829
 Agonoleptus Casey, 1914
 Amerinus Casey, 1884
 Angionychus Klug, 1853
 Anthracus Motschulsky, 1850
 Batoscelis Dejean, 1836
 Bradycellus Erichson, 1837
 Cratosoma Jeannel, 1948
 Cyptomicrus Vinson, 1939
 Dicheirotrichus Jacquelin du Val, 1855
 Egadyla Alluaud, 1916
 Euthenarus Bates, 1874
 Fuminoria Morita, 2006
 Goniocellus Casey, 1914
 Gugheorites Basilewsky, 1951
 Haplanister B.Moore, 1996
 Hemiaulax Bates, 1892
 Hippoloetis Laporte, 1835
 Idiomelas Tschitscherine, 1900
 Kaffovatus Clarke, 1972
 Kenyacus Alluaud, 1917
 Kiwiharpalus Larochelle & Larivière, 2005
 Lioholus Tschitscherine, 1897
 Loxoncus Schmidt-Goebel, 1846
 Pachytrachelus Chaudoir, 1852
 Parabradycellus N.Ito, 2003
 Paramecus Dejean, 1829
 Philodes LeConte, 1861
 Pholeodytes Britton, 1962
 Pogonodaptus G.Horn, 1881
 Polpochila Solier, 1849
 Psychristus Andrewes, 1930
 Rhabidius Basilewsky, 1948
 Stenolophus Dejean, 1821
 Uenanthracus Kasahara, 1994

References

External links

 

Harpalinae